Milutin Trnavac (Serbian Cyrillic: Милутин Трнавац; born 13 May 1979 in Kraljevo) is a Serbian former footballer who played predominantly as a midfielder.

Club career
Trnavac started his career with Sloga Kraljevo in 1997. Trnavac then played for Novi Sad until 2003. Trnavac also played for Mladost Apatin and Banat Zrenjanin in the Serbian SuperLiga.

In 2008, Trnavac joined Hungarian club Zalaegerszegi TE. In 2009, Trnavac returned to Sloga Kraljevo. In 2010, Trnavac joined Hong Kong First Division League side Tuen Mun.

In the summer of 2012, Trnavac again returned to Sloga Kraljevo. In the summer of 2013, Trnavac joined Kolubara of the Serbian League Belgrade.

Club statistics

External links

 Srbijafudbal profile

1979 births
Living people
Sportspeople from Kraljevo
Serbian footballers
Association football midfielders
FK Sloga Kraljevo players
RFK Novi Sad 1921 players
FK Mladost Apatin players
FK Banat Zrenjanin players
FK Kolubara players
OFK Radnički Kovači players
Serbian SuperLiga players
Zalaegerszegi TE players
Nemzeti Bajnokság I players
Tuen Mun SA players
Hong Kong First Division League players
Serbian expatriate footballers
Expatriate footballers in Hungary
Serbian expatriate sportspeople in Hungary
Expatriate footballers in Hong Kong
Serbian expatriate sportspeople in Hong Kong